The Monument to the Memory of Children - Victims of the Holocaust is a monument located in the Jewish cemetery on Okopowa Street in Warsaw, Poland, commemorating the children murdered in the Holocaust.

Description 
The monument was founded by Jacek Eisner. Its form refers to the high wall of the ghetto with barbed wire, to which plates, arranged in the shape of a menorah, lead. Ruins of the ghetto were placed at the bottom of the monument, on the surface of which are photographs of Jewish children who died during World War II. There is a plaque underneath it written in three languages: Polish, Hebrew and English, with the following content: To the memory of one million Jewish children murdered by German barbarians 1939-1945. The photographs include a picture of a girl in checkered clothes and a hat depicting Lusia, the daughter of Chaskiel Bronstein, the owner of the Fotografika photography studio in Tarnów, mentioned by Paweł Huelle in a short story Mercedes Benz.

The monument also contains: a symbolic grave of the Szteinman family, murdered during the Holocaust, and two commemorative plaques:

 the first in Polish, Hebrew and English that reads: Grandmother Masha had twenty grandchildren. Grandmother Hana had eleven, only I survived. Jacek Eisner.
 the second one in Polish, Hebrew and English with the text of a poem by Henryka Łazowertówna Mały Szmugler

References 

Holocaust memorials in Poland
Monuments and memorials in Warsaw